Marcel Muzard (20 February 1894 – 8 July 1966) was a French athlete. He competed in the men's pole vault at the 1924 Summer Olympics.

References

External links
 

1894 births
1966 deaths
Athletes (track and field) at the 1924 Summer Olympics
French male pole vaulters
Olympic athletes of France
Place of birth missing